James J. Caffrey served as chairman of the U.S. Securities and Exchange Commission between 1946 and 1947 and also served as a member from 1945 to 1947.

References

 

Members of the U.S. Securities and Exchange Commission
Truman administration personnel